Bellitaş can refer to:

 Bellitaş, Çınar
 Bellitaş, Hınıs